Jason Boyd may refer to:
Jason Boyd (baseball) (born 1973), Major League Baseball pitcher
Jason Boyd (actor), played Piers Polkiss in the Harry Potter films
Poo Bear (born 1979), American songwriter and record producer
Jason Boyd, American singer, lead vocalist for Audiovent